Ganj is a village in Tarom Rural District, in the Central District of Hajjiabad County, Hormozgan Province, Iran. At the 2006 census, its population was 776, in 198 families.

References 

Populated places in Hajjiabad County